The Knott Baronetcy, of Close House in the Parish of Heddon-on-the-Wall in the County of Northumberland, was a title in the Baronetage of the United Kingdom. It was created on 4 July 1917 for the shipping magnate and Conservative politician James Knott. The title became extinct on the death of the second Baronet in 1949.

Knott baronets, of Close House (1917)
Sir James Knott, 1st Baronet (1855–1934)
Sir Thomas Garbutt Knott, 2nd Baronet (1879–1949)

References

Extinct baronetcies in the Baronetage of the United Kingdom